Liantang Subdistrict is a subdistrict of Luohu District, Shenzhen, China. It is located south of Xianhu Botanical Garden and directly north of Ta Kwu Ling, Hong Kong across the Shenzhen River.

References

Subdistricts of Shenzhen
Luohu District